Athletics competitions at the 2023 Pan American Games in Santiago, Chile were held on October 22, between October 29 and November 4, 2023 at the Athletics Stadium in the Julio Martínez National Stadium Coliseum, with the marathon and walks being held in the Santiago streets.

A total of 48 events will be contested, equally divided among men and women.

Qualification

A total of 778 athletes will qualify to compete. Each nation may enter a maximum of two athletes in each individual event (provided the second person is the reigning 2022 area champion), and one team per relay event. Each event has a maximum number of competitors and a minimum performance standard. Chile as host nation, is granted an automatic athlete slot per event, in the event no one qualifies for that respective event.

The winner of each individual event (plus top two relay teams per event), from four regional qualification tournaments automatically qualified with the standard (even if not reached). If an event quota is not filled, athletes will be invited till the maximum number per event is reached.

For relays, each country can enter two relay only competitors to participate. The other members of each relay team  must be registered in an individual event. 

Qualifying standards must be achieved between 1 January 2022 and 18 September 2023.

Competition schedule
The competition schedule for athletics at the 2023 Pan American Games is announced.

Participating nations
A total of 41 nations entered athletes. The number of athletes a nation has entered is in parentheses beside the name of the country.

Medal summary

Medal table

Results

Men

Women

See also
Athletics at the 2019 Pan American Games
Athletics at the 2023 European Games

References

External links
schedule book
2023 Panam Sports Santiago home page

 
Events at the 2023 Pan American Games
2023
Pan American Games